was a Japanese organization advocating the abolition of the Imperial system and the establishment of a republican form. The group was started in 1987 by a radical group of students at Waseda University in Tokyo and street punk rockers. They often used street performances to spread their message.

In 1996 members of Aki no Arashi won a lawsuit against the Tokyo Metropolitan Government for unlawful arrests and battery by Tokyo police. The events took place during a series of rallies organized by the group in 1989, after the death of Emperor Showa.

See also
 Hantenren
 Anti-monarchism in Japan

References 

Political organizations based in Japan
Republicanism in Japan
Organizations established in 1987